is a Japanese professional baseball Pitcher for the Fukuoka SoftBank Hawks of Nippon Professional Baseball.

Professional career
On October 25, 2015, Sugiyama was drafted by the Fukuoka SoftBank Hawks in the 2018 Nippon Professional Baseball draft.

In 2019 season, Sugiyama hurt his right ankle during spring training. On September 7, he debuted in the Pacific League against the Chiba Lotte Marines as a relief pitcher. Sugiyama pitched two games in the Pacific League.

In the match against the Tohoku Rakuten Golden Eagles on July 8, 2020, Sugiyama recorded his fastest 157km/h (97.58 mph) fastball. In 2020 season, he finished the regular season with a 11 Games pitched, a 0–0 Win–loss record, a 2.16 ERA, a one Hold, a 22 strikeouts in 16.2 innings. In the 2020 Japan Series against the Yomiuri Giants, Sugiyama pitched as a relief pitcher in Game 2 and contributed to the team's fourth consecutive Japan Series championship with no runs in one inning.

On April 7, 2021, Sugiyama recorded his first win against the Hokkaido Nippon-Ham Fighters as a relief pitcher. In 2021 season, he finished the regular season with 15 Games pitched, a 2–2 Win–loss record, a 3.20 ERA, a one Holds and a 29 strikeouts in 25.1 innings.

On May 8, 2022, he earned his first win as a starting pitcher against the Chiba Lotte Marines. In 2022 season, he finished the regular season with 10 Games pitched, a 1–3 Win–loss record, a 6.80 ERA, and a 37 strikeouts in 42.1 innings.

References

External links

 Career statistics - NPB.jp
 40 Kazuki Sugiyama PLAYERS2022 - Fukuoka SoftBank Hawks Official site

1997 births
Living people
Fukuoka SoftBank Hawks players
Japanese expatriate baseball players in Puerto Rico
Nippon Professional Baseball pitchers
Baseball people from Shizuoka Prefecture
People from Shizuoka (city)
Gigantes de Carolina players